Joe Bird may refer to:

Joe Bird (singer) (1967–2009), member of Canadian comedy troupe Three Dead Trolls in a Baggie
Joe Bird (baseball), manager of teams such as the Cooleemee Cards
J. Edward Bird (1868–1948), Canadian legal figure

See also
Joseph Byrd (disambiguation)